Castagniers Abbey is a Cistercian nunnery, in Castagniers, 12 km from Nice in the Alpes-Maritimes departement in southwestern France.

In 1865, Dom Marie-Bernard Barnouin, restorer of Sénanque Abbey, founded a Cistercian community for women in Mane in the diocese of Digne, and in 1869, another in Reillanne, the Abbaye de Notre-Dame des Prés. In 1872 the two communities were united in Reillanne. 

In 1930 the community left Reillanne to settle in Castagniers. The community was elevated to the rank of an abbey in 1962.

The first abbess, Mother Marguerite de la Trinité, saw to it that the place became a chocolate factory, which is still working today. The nuns have a guest house and they welcome guests wishing to make a retreat.

Notes

Cistercian nunneries in France
Buildings and structures in Alpes-Maritimes
19th-century Christian monasteries
19th-century Roman Catholic church buildings in France